Omar Arnaout (born 20 October 2000) is a Romania-based singer. He was the winner of the first season of Next Star, a Romanian singing contest broadcast on Antena 1, in 2013.

Early life 
Omar Arnaout's mother is Romanian and his father is Lebanese. He is the youngest of three brothers and currently resides in Bucharest, Romania.

Career 
After his success, he released a number of singles and music videos.

He has appeared in shows, including Kinge Majike in Albania, or Bama Music Awards in Germany, Hamburg, in which he released an album with more than 20 official songs.

Discography
2017: Omar Arnaout (compilation album)
2020: First Arabian Journey

Videography
2013: "Intr-o zi"
2015: "Beautiful life"
2015: "House of the Prophet" (بیت النبی)
2015: "Cupidon"
2015: "Cloud of Lebanon"
2016: "I Love You"
2016: "Lara"
2016: "Story of life"
2016: "I Miss You"
2016: "Yalla habibti"
2016: "Alhayat" (feat. Letty)
2016: "You reminded me, Eid"
2016: "Blessed Eid"
2016: "Ya Kuwait Al ezz" (يا كويت العز) 
2017: "MashaAllah"
2017: "Amirati"
2017: "Women"
2017: "Insan"
2018: "Edrab"
2018: "A piece of sugar"
2018: "Por tu amor"
2019: "Salimuli"
2019: "Ya ruhi"
2019: "Ahla kelma"
2019: "Buna dimineata"
2019: "Embrace Ramadan" (بالأحضان يا رمضان)
2020: "Bokra"
2020: "Jamalik"
2020: "Beirut" (Beirut Explosion Tribute)
2020: "Allahumma" (اللهَّم)
2020: "Month of Rhapsody" (شهر الطاعة)
2020: "Relaxing piano music" (Piano by Omar Arnaout)
2021: "Alquds Qibla" (القدس قِبلة)
2021: "Stelele pe cer" (النجوم في السماء)
2021: "Drumul spre succes" (الطريق إلى النجاح)
2021: "Diva din Dubai" (نجمة من دبي)
2021: "Ya Rab" (يا رب)
2021: "Words for Palestine" (كلمات لفلسطين)
2021: "Amor Amor"
2021: "Ce fata"
2022: "Draga mea mamica"
2022: "Nimeni nu a zis"
2023: "La inima mea"

2020: "Ya lel" (with Tzanca Uraganu & BlvckMatias)
2020: "Dreamy Night" (Omar feat. Miruna Diaconescu)
2021: "Dragoste pacatoasa" (Omar feat. Miruna Diaconescu)
2021: "Stelele pe cer" (Omar feat. Miruna Diaconescu)
2021: "1001 Nopti" (Omar feat. Leo de la Kuweit)
2021: "Am Un Foc La Inimioara" (Omar feat. Costel Biju)
2021: "Salma" (Omar feat. George Talent)
2021: "Dalila" (with Deles Trapaneles)
2021: "Bermude Colorate" (with Golden Gang)

featured in 
2015: "Flying Solo" (Omar Arnaout & Lora)
2016: "One life" (Omar feat. Ardit Cuni)
2017: "Insaha" (Omar feat. Chawki)
2020: "Jamilia" (with Deles Trapaneles)
2021: "Ma Chérie" (Alex Velea with Deles Trapaneles)
2021: "Jocul Calamarului" (Omar feat. MIRUNA DIACONESCU) (لعبة الحبار)
2022: "Ce Vrea Lumea De La Noi" (Omar feat. shondy Balkanic zannidache) (Yalli Jay)
2022: "Alinta-ma Un Pic" (Omar Arnaout & MariusBabanu & GeorgeTalent)
2022: "Habibi" (Omar Arnaout & Alex Velea) (حبيبي Rework)
2022: "Cicatricea" (Omar Arnaout & Alex Velea)
2022: "Arde ca Bricheta" (Omar Arnaout & GeorgeTalent)
2022: "Nu vreau banii tai" (Omar Arnaout & MirunaDiaconescu) (Rework)

Awards and recognition 
Arnaout is the winner of many titles, including "The Best Young Artist" at Bama Music Awards, "Favorite International Project" on Mamaia Music Awards (Romania) 2016, "The best European artist" at Mamaia Music Awards (Romania) 2017, "The biggest Romanian Helper for orphans," in 2017, 2018, and 2019.

Besides his success in Europe, Omar Arnaout has a good relationship with the Persian Gulf region, especially with Qatar, where he has performed several times at big venues like the National Theatre, English Schools (kids' show) and the national Atheneum of Qatar at Doha.

References

External links
Official website

2000 births
Living people
Romanian Muslims
Romanian people of Lebanese descent